Michael or Mike or Mick McManus may refer to:

 Michael McManus (American actor) (born 1946), American character actor
 Michael McManus (Canadian actor) (born 1962), Canadian actor
 Mike McManus (columnist) (born 1942), American columnist
 Michael A. McManus Jr. (born 1943), American political strategist
 Mick McManus (wrestler) (1920–2013), English wrestler
 Mick McManus (footballer) (born 1954), Scottish footballer

See also
 Michaela McManus (born 1983), American actress